The 1965 U.S. National Championships (now known as the US Open) was a tennis tournament that took place on the outdoor grass courts at the West Side Tennis Club, Forest Hills in New York City, United States. The tournament ran from 1 September until 12 September. It was the 85th staging of the U.S. National Championships, and the fourth Grand Slam tennis event of 1965.

Finals

Men's singles

 Manuel Santana defeated  Cliff Drysdale  6–2, 7–9, 7–5, 6–1

Women's singles

 Margaret Smith defeated  Billie Jean Moffitt  8–6, 7–5

Men's doubles
 Roy Emerson /  Fred Stolle defeated   Frank Froehling /  Charles Pasarell 6–4, 10–12, 7–5, 6–3

Women's doubles
 Carole Graebner /  Nancy Richey defeated  Billie Jean Moffitt /  Karen Susman 6–4, 6–4

Mixed doubles
 Margaret Smith /  Fred Stolle defeated  Judy Tegart /  Frank Froehling 6–2, 6–2

References

External links
Official US Open website

 
U.S. National Championships
U.S. National Championships (tennis) by year
September 1965 sports events in the United States
U.S. National Championships
U.S. National Championships